is a Japanese manga artist from Tsuchiura, Ibaraki Prefecture who is known for his work on the manga series MegaMan NT Warrior.

His hobbies are motorsports and watching martial arts. He is also a big animal lover. He has said that if he hadn't been able to make his debut as a manga artist, he would have ended up working for a life insurance company.

Works
 Charger 500
 Godzilla X Megaguirus: The G Elimination Project War
 Kaze no Eldorado
 The King of Fighters G (1996, Shinseisha)
 MegaMan NT Warrior (2001, Shogakukan)
 Mega Man Star Force (2008, Shogakukan)
 Dialga VS Palkia VS Darkrai (2008, Shogakukan)
 Kamen Rider Fourze (2012, Shogakukan)
 Mobile Suit Gundam AGE ~Climax Hero~ (2012)
 Pokémon the Movie: I Choose You! (2018, Shogakukan)
 Mega Man 11 (2018, Shogakukan)

References

External links
  
 
 Ryo Takamisaki manga at Media Arts Database 
 
 
 Interview with Ryo Takamisaki, the creator of the manga "Rockman.Exe"! Looking back on memories of the series 

1963 births
Living people
Manga artists
Nagoya University alumni